Narrow may refer to:

 The Narrow, rock band from South Africa
 Narrow banking, proposed banking system that would eliminate bank runs and the need for a deposit insurance
 Narrow-gauge railway, a railway that has a track gauge narrower than the 4 ft 8½ in of standard gauge railways
 Narrow vs wide format, a style of displaying tabular data
 Narrowboat or narrow boat, a boat of a distinctive design made to fit the narrow canals of Great Britain
 Narrow (album), a 2012 album by Austrian musical project Soap&Skin
 "Narrow", a song by Mayday Parade from Black Lines

See also
 Narro (disambiguation)
 The Narrows (disambiguation)
 Narrowing (disambiguation)